Sky Five Live is a two-record album by Sky recorded live at The Comedy Theatre & The Concert Hall, Melbourne, The Concert Hall, Perth, The Festival Theatre, Adelaide and The Capitol Theatre, Sydney. It was mixed at Studio 3, EMI Abbey Road, London and mastered by Nick Webb. It was released in January 1984 on the Ariola record label. Unlike most live albums, the majority of the tracks included on this release are new, with only four tracks having been previously released ("Dance of the Little Fairies", "Sahara" and "Hotta", all on Sky 2, and "Meheeco", on Sky 3), all of them in shorter and generally very different versions from the ones featured here.

In 2015, Esoteric Recordings continued a schedule of remasters and expanded releases with this recording.

Track listing
Side 1 – 26:15
"The Animals" (Herbie Flowers/Steve Gray) – 20:56
"The Swan" (Camille Saint-Saëns, Arranged by Tristan Fry) – 4:36

Side 2 – 19:46
"KP I" (Kevin Peek) – 7:26
"Dance of The Little Fairies" (Herbie Flowers) – 4:33
"Love Duet" (Steve Gray) – 7:06

Side 3 – 27:20
"The Bathroom Song" (Herbie Flowers) – 2:48
"KP II" (Kevin Peek) – 3:36
"Antigua" (John Williams/Angus Trowbridge) – 3:55
"Sahara" (Kevin Peek) – 7:44
"Sakura Variations" (Kevin Peek/John Williams) – 7:56

Side 4 – 22:50
"Meheeco" (Herbie Flowers/Steve Gray) – 12:59
"Hotta" (Kevin Peek/Herbie Flowers) – 9:00

Esoldun 1995 two CD edition

2015 two disc reissue edition

Musicians
Tristan Fry: Drums, Percussion (Premier Drum Kit, Müsser Marimba, Waterphone)
Kevin Peek: Guitars (Gibson L5S, Fender Stratocaster, Ovation Classical, Ovation Folklore, AMD Digital delay unit)
Steve Gray: Keyboards (Acoustic Grand Piano, William De Blaise 2 Manual Harpsichord, Yamaha GS1 Grand Synthesiser, Oberheim OBXA Polyphonic Synthesiser, Korg 3XC Organ, Yamaha CS01/BC3 Monophonic Synthesiser ("Gobsynth"), Acoustic Piano/Roland JP8 interface system (used on 'Hotta' and 'Meheeco') and Harpsichord/Oberheim OBXA interface system (used on 'The Animals', 'Love Duet' and 'Dance of the Little Fairies': Developed by Andrew Jones)
Herbie Flowers: Bass (Mrs. Flowers Basses, Old Blue Fender bass guitar with five-year-old black tape (nylon) wound Rotosound strings, String Bass)
John Williams: Guitar (Takamine Hirade: model E9)

Production
Produced by: SKY, Tony Clark and Haydn Bendall
Recorded by: AAV-Australia Pty. Ltd. Mobile Recording Studio.
Sound & Lighting by: Jands Australia Pty. Sound & Lighting Systems.
SKY Tour Promoters: The Paul Dainty Corporation & Clifford Hocking Enterprises.

Charts

Certifications

References 

1983 live albums
Ariola Records albums
Sky (English/Australian band) albums